Tom Brighton (born 28 March 1984) is a Scottish professional footballer, who played as a centre forward.

Early life
Brighton was educated at Marr College in Troon.

Career
Brighton began his career at Rangers, where he played only one game, before going to Scunthorpe United for a short loan spell. He was released from his contract with Rangers in June 2005.

He played in the Scottish Youth Cup final in 2002. Rangers defeated Ayr United 4–2 at New Douglas Park, with Brighton assisting Rangers' last goal.

He was then recruited by Clyde during the close season and made his debut in the opening league game against Ross County. Brighton was voted Man of the Match in Clyde's Scottish Cup shock win over Celtic. He left Clyde in 2006 after manager Graham Roberts was accused of racist remarks during a pre-season tour of Canada.

Brighton moved to Millwall in June 2006. His time at Millwall was however disrupted by several injuries.

On 8 May 2008 it was announced that Brighton had signed a pre-contract with St Mirren. Brighton's contract was not renewed at the end of the 2009–10 season.

He signed for Stirling Albion in February 2011. It was announced he was to be released from his contract on 15 May 2011.

Queen of the South manager, Gus MacPherson, having known Brighton from his time as St Mirren manager, offered him training facilities during the summer of 2011 and he also played him in a few pre-season friendlies. Brighton was then offered a contract on 21 July 2011 with Queens which he accepted. His debut was on 23 July 2011 the extra time 2–0 defeat away at Ayr United in the 2011–12 Scottish Challenge Cup.
Tom scored a 78th-minute winner against Stranraer in his second start.

Brighton left Queens for Junior side Irvine Meadow in July 2012. In June 2013 it was announced that he had left the club.

See also
 2001–02 Rangers F.C. season | 2002–03 | 2003–04 | 2004–05
 2005–06 Clyde F.C. season
 2008–09 St Mirren F.C. season

References

External links

1984 births
Living people
Footballers from Irvine, North Ayrshire
People educated at Marr College
Scottish footballers
Association football forwards
Rangers F.C. players
Scunthorpe United F.C. players
Clyde F.C. players
Millwall F.C. players
St Mirren F.C. players
Dundee F.C. players
Stirling Albion F.C. players
Queen of the South F.C. players
Irvine Meadow XI F.C. players
Scottish Premier League players
Scottish Football League players
Scottish Junior Football Association players
English Football League players
Scotland under-21 international footballers
People from Troon
Footballers from South Ayrshire